Westall railway station is located on the Pakenham and Cranbourne lines in Victoria, Australia. It serves the south-eastern Melbourne suburb of Clayton South, and opened on 6 February 1951.

History
Opening on 6 February 1951, Westall station originally comprised two workers-only platforms for staff at the adjacent Martin & King railway coach-building factory. On 1 June 1959, the station became available to the general public, and all services began stopping there. The station, like the locality itself, gets its name from an early market garden proprietor who lived in the area.

On 19 July 1975, the former timber station building on Platform 1 was damaged by fire.

The station had a stabling yard located at its southern end, as well as a number of industrial sidings serving nearby factories. On 17 April 1998, the Westall train maintenance centre was officially opened in the former goods yard, as part of the decentralisation of train stabling and maintenance from the former Jolimont Yards. The buildings were approximately 2,850 m2 in size, and permitted bogie repair and replacement, under-carriage and overhead work. The facility cost $15 million, which also included the Bayswater facility.

In 2000, the former Westall Road level crossing, which was located at the down end of the station, was replaced with an overpass.

On 26 July 2006, a fire in the waiting room on Platform 1 caused major damage to half the station building, the ticket machines, seats and a section of the platform. The city-bound platform was closed off and passenger services to Flinders Street operated express from Springvale to Clayton, bypassing Westall, until temporary fencing was placed around the building. The damaged section was subsequently demolished and rebuilt.

In May 2008, the Victorian State Government announced that the Westall station precinct would receive a $151 million upgrade, which included a rebuilt station, a new third platform, a third 2.6-kilometre track between Centre Road and Springvale Road and additional storage space at the Westall stabling yard. Work commenced in January 2010, with the majority of the works completed by October of that year. Following these works, Westall was upgraded to a Premium Station.

Platforms and services
Westall has one side platform (Platform 1) and one island platform with two faces (Platforms 2 and 3), linked by a footbridge. Access to the platforms is via stairs and lifts. The side platform features a customer service window, an enclosed waiting room and toilets, while the island platform features an enclosed waiting room. A number of services terminate at Westall and return back to the city.

It is served by Pakenham and Cranbourne line trains.

Platform 1:
  all stations and limited express services to Flinders Street
  all stations and limited express services to Flinders Street

Platform 2:
  all stations and limited express services to Flinders Street
  all stations and limited express services to Flinders Street
  all stations services to Pakenham
  all stations services to Cranbourne

Platform 3:
  all stations services to Pakenham
  all stations services to Cranbourne

Future services:
In addition to the current services the Network Development Plan Metropolitan Rail proposes linking the Pakenham and Cranbourne lines to both the Sunbury line and under-construction Melbourne Airport rail link via the Metro Tunnel.
  express services to West Footscray and Sunbury (2025 onwards)
  express services to Melbourne Airport (2029 onwards)

Transport links
Ventura Bus Lines operates two routes via Westall station, under contract to Public Transport Victoria:
 : to Oakleigh station 
 : Moorabbin station – Parkmore Shopping Centre

Gallery

References

External links
 
 Melway map at street-directory.com.au
 Westall Train Station Video

Premium Melbourne railway stations
Rail freight terminals in Victoria (Australia)
Railway stations in Melbourne
Railway stations in Australia opened in 1954
Railway stations in the City of Kingston (Victoria)